Heiki Sarapuu (born 11 December 1965) is an Estonian athletics competitor.

He was born in Valga. In 1991 he graduated from Tallinn Pedagogical Institute's Faculty of Physical Education.

He started his sporting exercising under the guidance of Raimond Luts. Later his coaches have been Olav Karikosk, Toomas Turb and Meelis Minn. He has competed at the IAAF World Cross Country Championships. He is multiple-times Estonian champion in different running disciplines. 1984–2001 he was a member of Estonian national athletics team.

Personal best:
 1500 m: 3.50,01 (1989)
 3000 m: 8.08,58 (1997)
 5000 m: 14.21,86 (1996)
 10 000 m: 29.43,53 (1995)
 half marathon: 1:08.20 (1995)

References

Living people
1965 births
Estonian male long-distance runners
Estonian male middle-distance runners
Tallinn University alumni
Sportspeople from Valga, Estonia